Lenin Gani (9 December 1967- May 2013) was a highly respected Bangladeshi sports journalist. He was the sports editor of New Age, and later Bdnews24.com, and was a senior member of the Bangladesh Sports Journalists Association.

Career 
Lenin worked for a number of major newspapers of Bangladesh, including, from 1993 to 2006, The Daily Star. In 2001 Lenin won the prestigious Best Sports Report award from Dhaka Reporters Unity.

Death 
In 2008 Lenin was diagnosed with a rare terminal illness Pulmonary Hypertension. He moved to the UK to receive treatment, and continued to contribute to Bangladeshi journalism in his debilitating state. On May 23, 2013 Lenin finally succumb to his condition.

Family 
Lenin has a wife and daughter who live in the United Kingdom. His paternal family hail from Beanibazar.

See also 
 List of Bangladeshi people
 Deaths in May 2013

References

External Link 

Other sources
bdnews24.com
dhakatribune.com

dhakamirror.com
Cricket and the Law

Bangladeshi journalists
Bangladeshi columnists
Bangladeshi male writers
People from Beanibazar Upazila
Respiratory disease deaths in England
Deaths from hypertension
1967 births
2013 deaths